Hibiya Park (日比谷公園 Hibiya Kōen) is a park in Chiyoda City, Tokyo, Japan. It covers an area of 161,636.66 m2 (40 acres) between the east gardens of the Imperial Palace to the north, the Shinbashi district to the southeast and the Kasumigaseki government district to the west.

History 
The land was occupied by the estates of the Mōri clan and Nabeshima clan during the Edo period, and it was used for army maneuvers during the Meiji period. It was converted to a park and opened to the public on June 1, 1903.

On September 5, 1905, the park was the origin of the Hibiya riots, a major citywide riot that erupted in protest of the Treaty of Portsmouth which ended the Russo-Japanese War (1904−1905). The riots lasted two days resulting in seventeen people being killed and 331 arrested, as well a large amount of property damage. The riots were against the terms of the treaty, which were lenient to Russia, but also against bureaucrats who refused accept the will of the people on foreign policy.

The park is famous for the Shisei Kaikan (市政会館), a brick building built in Gothic style in 1929, which once housed the Domei Tsushin state wire service and its postwar successors Kyodo News and Jiji Press. The park is also home to the "Risky Ginkgo," a ginkgo tree that is about 500 years old and almost cost the park's designer his job when he fought to save the tree in 1901.

The park is also known for its open-air concert venue, Hibiya Open-Air Concert Hall (日比谷野外音楽堂), commonly known as Yaon (野音), as well as for its tennis courts (for which reservations are hotly contested because of their proximity to the financial and government districts). World War II took a toll on the park when almost all the trees and fencing was used for the war effort.

Surrounding buildings

 Attorneys' Hall (Japan Federation of Bar Associations headquarters)
 Fukoku Seimei Building
 Imperial Hotel, Tokyo
 Ministry of the Environment
 Ministry of Health, Labour and Welfare
 Ministry of Justice
 Mizuho Bank Building
 Nissay Theatre
 NTT Hibiya Building
 Shinsei Bank Building
 Sumitomo Mitsui Banking Corporation Building

Education
 operates public elementary and junior high schools. Chiyoda Elementary School (千代田小学校) is the zoned elementary of Hibiya Park. There is a freedom of choice system for junior high schools in Chiyoda Ward, and so there are no specific junior high school zones.

Gallery

References

External links

 Tokyo Parks Association official webpage

Chiyoda, Tokyo
Parks and gardens in Tokyo